Al Ahli Stadium is a multi-use stadium in the Zinj district of the city of Manama, in Bahrain.  It is currently used mostly for football matches and is the home ground of Al-Ahli.  The stadium holds 10,000 people. The stadium also occasionally hosts concerts.

References

Football venues in Bahrain
Sport in Manama
Buildings and structures in Manama